Clinton is a ghost town in DeWitt County, in the U.S. state of Texas.

History
Clinton was once the county seat of DeWitt County. A post office called Clinton was established in 1849, and remained in operation until it was discontinued in 1886.

References

Geography of DeWitt County, Texas
Ghost towns in Texas